Russell Island may refer to:

 Russell Island (British Columbia), Canada, one of the Gulf Islands
 Russell Island (Frankland Islands), in Queensland, Australia
 Russell Island (Michigan), United States
 Russell Island (Moreton Bay), in Queensland, Australia
 Russell Island (Nunavut), Canada
 Russell Island (Ontario), Canada, in Lake Huron
 Russell Island, Bahamas

See also
Russell Islands, an island group in the South-Western Pacific